Catherine Gabriel (born 4 September 1994) is a French handballer for Debreceni VSC and the French national team.

She represented France at the 2019 World Women's Handball Championship.

Achievements
Division 2:
Winner: 2015

References

External links

1994 births
Living people
Sportspeople from Yaoundé
French female handball players
French sportspeople of Cameroonian descent